Rajaram II (April 13, 1850 – November 30, 1870), of the Bhonsle dynasty, was a Raja of Kolhapur from August 18, 1866 to November 30, 1870. During his reign, the gun salute of the state was increased from 17 to 19 guns. The first of his line to travel abroad, he died aged 20 in Florence, Italy, and was cremated  on the banks of the Arno River by special permission granted by the Italian Council of Ministers. He was succeeded by Shivaji VI.

See also
 Monumento all'Indiano, Florence

References

1850 births
1870 deaths